430 Tactical Helicopter Squadron is a unit of the Canadian Forces under the Royal Canadian Air Force. It operates Bell CH-146 Griffons from CFB Valcartier, near Quebec City in Quebec, Canada.

History
No. 430 Squadron RCAF was a unit of the Royal Canadian Air Force formed during World War II as the "City of Sudbury" squadron in 1943. Initially created as an army co-operation squadron, 430 was redesignated as a fighter reconnaissance unit later that year. The unit was stationed in England, France, Belgium, the Netherlands, and Germany, and flew photo reconnaissance missions in support of planning for the Normandy landings. After D-Day, missions included before-and-after photography of attacks on V-1 flying bomb launch sites and support for ground forces. 430 Squadron was disbanded in Germany in August 1945.

In the Cold War period, the squadron was reformed in November 1951 at RCAF Station North Bay, flying the Canadair F-86 Sabre. It was given the nickname Silver Falcon. 430 Fighter Squadron went to 2 Wing RCAF Station Grostenquin near Grostenquin, France in September 1952. The squadron was located at Grostenquin until deactivation in September 1962.

430 Fighter Squadron was reactivated at 3 Wing Zweibrücken, West Germany in February 1963, and transitioned to the Canadair CF-104 Starfighter. The squadron moved to 1 Wing Lahr, West Germany in February 1969 until it was disbanded in May 1970.

The unit reformed again in 1971 as a French-language Canadian Forces tactical helicopter squadron at Valcartier and known officially as 430e Escadron tactique d'hélicoptères. There it operated the Bell CH-136 Kiowa and the Bell CH-135 Twin Huey in support of 5 Canadian Mechanized Brigade Group. The unit transitioned to the CH-146 Griffon in 1994.

Operations
The squadron was deployed as part of the United Nations Mission in Haiti (UNMIH) and also provided core personnel to the Rotary Wing Aviation Unit of the Multinational Force and Observers on peacekeeping operations in the Sinai.

Aircraft
Curtiss Tomahawk Mk. I & II
North American Mustang Mk. I
Supermarine Spitfire Mk. XIV
Canadair Sabre
Canadair CF-104 Starfighter
Bell CH-135 Twin Huey
Bell CH-136 Kiowa
Bell CH-146 Griffon

References

 430 Squadron History Retrieved 2016-04-14

External links

430 Tactical Helicopter Squadron official website

Canadian Forces aircraft squadrons
Royal Canadian Air Force squadrons
Military units and formations established in 1943
Military units and formations disestablished in 1945
Military units and formations established in 1951
Military units and formations disestablished in 1962
Military units and formations established in 1963
Military units and formations disestablished in 1969
Military units and formations established in 1971
1943 establishments in Canada
1945 disestablishments in Canada
1951 establishments in Canada
1962 disestablishments in Canada
1963 establishments in Canada
1969 disestablishments in Canada
1971 establishments in Canada
1943 establishments in Quebec
1951 establishments in Quebec
1963 establishments in Quebec
1969 disestablishments in Quebec
1971 establishments in Quebec
Military units and formations of Canada in World War II